The Oskaloosa City Square Commercial Historic District is a  historic district in Oskaloosa, Iowa that includes Early Commercial, Italianate, and Romanesque Revival architecture.  It was listed on the National Register of Historic Places in 1986.  At the time of its nomination it included 68 contributing buildings.

The district includes the Mahaska County Courthouse, Oskaloosa City Park and Band Stand, Oskaloosa Fire Station and the Oskaloosa City Hall which are separately listed on the National Register.

References

External links

National Register of Historic Places in Mahaska County, Iowa
Italianate architecture in Iowa
Romanesque Revival architecture in Iowa
Buildings designated early commercial in the National Register of Historic Places
Oskaloosa, Iowa
Historic districts on the National Register of Historic Places in Iowa
Historic districts in Mahaska County, Iowa